Andrei Alekseyevich Sorokin (born 28 March 1996) is a Russian football player. He plays for Sakhalin Yuzhno-Sakhalinsk.

Club career
He made his debut in the Russian Professional Football League for FC Sakhalin Yuzhno-Sakhalinsk on 22 July 2015 in a game against FC Smena Komsomolsk-na-Amure.

References

External links
 Profile by Russian Professional Football League
 
 

1996 births
Footballers from Moscow
Living people
Russian footballers
Russia youth international footballers
Association football defenders
FC Lokomotiv Moscow players
PFC CSKA Moscow players
FC Sakhalin Yuzhno-Sakhalinsk players
FC Rostov players
FC Gorodeya players
FC Dynamo Stavropol players
Russian Second League players
Belarusian Premier League players
Russian expatriate footballers
Expatriate footballers in Belarus
Russian expatriate sportspeople in Belarus